Palaeotoma styphelana is a species of moth of the family Tortricidae. It is found in Australia, where it has been recorded from Tasmania, Victoria, Queensland and New South Wales.

The wingspan is about 21 mm. The forewings are whitish grey, with fine blackish strigulae (fine streaks) and irroration (speckling). The hindwings are pale grey.

The larvae feed on the top shoots of Myrtaceae species. Larval feeding causes a gall to form.

References

Moths described in 1881
Schoenotenini